The 1980 U.S. Figure Skating Championships took place at The Omni in Atlanta, Georgia. Medals were awarded in three colors: gold (first), silver (second), and bronze (third) in four disciplines – men's singles, ladies' singles, pair skating, and ice dancing – across three levels: senior, junior, and novice.

The event determined the U.S. teams for the 1980 Winter Olympics and 1980 World Championships.

Senior results

Men

Ladies
(incomplete standings)

Pairs

Ice dancing

Junior results

Men
(incomplete standings)

Ladies

Pairs

Ice dancing

Novice results

Men
(incomplete standings)

Ladies
(incomplete standings)

Pairs

Ice dancing

External links
 Skaters subpar in national meet

U.S. Figure Skating Championships
United States Figure Skating Championships, 1980
United States Figure Skating Championships, 1980
U.S. Figure Skating
U.S. Figure Skating Championships